University Town station is a Metro station on Line 5 of the Shenzhen Metro. It opened on 22 June 2011. This station is an underground station and serves the University Town of Shenzhen.

Station layout

Exits

References

External links

 Shenzhen Metro University Town Station (Chinese)
 Shenzhen Metro University Town Station (English)

Shenzhen Metro stations
Railway stations in Guangdong
Nanshan District, Shenzhen
Railway stations in China opened in 2011